Jake Bell (born November 7, 1974) is a fiction writer. Bell is author of the popular The Amazing Adventures of Nate Banks series, published by Scholastic, Inc. and the writer of the webcomic Model Student.

Background 

Bell grew up in the Mesa, Arizona and attended Arizona State University, earning a bachelor's degree in Broadcast Journalism and a Master's in Business Administration. He worked as a sports reporter and anchor at NBC affiliates KYMA in Yuma, Arizona and WJHG in Panama City Beach, Florida.

Bell began freelance writing for Cracked.com in 2005. His first book in The Amazing Adventures of Nate Banks series, Secret Identity Crisis, was published by Scholastic Books in 2010.

Bibliography 

The Amazing Adventures of Nate Banks: Secret Identity Crisis (May 2010)
The Amazing Adventures of Nate Banks: Freezer Burned (May 2010)
The Amazing Adventures of Nate Banks: Red Alert (October 2010)
The Amazing Adventures of Nate Banks: The Comic Con (February 2011)
Megamatrix: Hero Within (November 2010)

External links
 Official website of the Amazing Adventures of Nate Banks Books
 JakeBell.com
 Model Student

References 

American comics writers
Writers from Mesa, Arizona
1974 births
Living people
Arizona State University alumni